On November 2, 2010, Illinois voters approved the Illinois Governor Recall Amendment, a legislatively referred constitutional amendment to the Constitution of Illinois. The amendment changed the state constitution to allow recall elections of Illinois governors.

Background
Illinois had seen four of the eight governors that preceded the incumbent governor, Pat Quinn, be convicted of felonies. The movement to adopt the amendment also was riding the recent public sentiment following the scandals related to former governor Rod Blagojevich, who was removed from office by impeachment.

Passage in the state legislature
It was required that, in order to qualify for the ballot, the measure be approved by 60% approval of both the Illinois House of Representatives and the Illinois Senate.

The amendment had been proposed by state representative Jack D. Franks and state senator Daniel Cronin. Michael Noland was the one to formally introduce it when it came before the Illinois Senate.

Changes to the state constitution
Effective December 3, 2010, per the amendment, Article III of the Illinois Constitution was amended with the addition of the new section, section 7, which read,

Referendum
The amendment was referred to the voters in a referendum during the general election of 2010 Illinois elections on November 2, 2012.

Ballot language
The ballot question read,

Arguments
Proponents argued that it empowered citizens, and was justified by corruption in the state.

Some opponents argued that recall elections are costly. Others argued that the signature barriers were too high. Others also criticized it as not allowing true citizen-initiated recall, with the Illinois Policy Institute deriding it as "permission slip democracy" for the requirement of getting an affidavit signed by "at least 20 members of the House of Representatives, and at least 10 members of the Senate, with no more than half of the signatures of members of each chamber coming from members of the same established political party."

The American Civil Liberties Union argued that the measure could lead to expensive litigation.

Endorsements

Result
In order to be approved, the measure required either 60% support among those specifically voting on the amendment or 50% support among all ballots cast in the elections. The 60% support threshold was exceeded.

References

Governor Recall Amendment
2010 Illinois elections
Governor Recall Amendment
2010 ballot measures
Governor of Illinois
Electoral system ballot measures in the United States